Melisa Filis (born 30 July 2002) is an English professional footballer who plays as a midfielder for Women's Super League club West Ham United.

Club career

Arsenal 
Coming through the Arsenal academy, Filis made her senior debut for the Gunners on 6 December 2018 as an 82nd minute substitute during a 
5–0 win over Charlton Athletic in the 2018–19 League Cup group stage. She made her FA WSL debut on 27 January 2019 against Reading Women at Adams Park, entering as a 93rd minute substitute and providing an assist for Katie McCabe 22 seconds later to seal a 3–0 victory. Filis' only Arsenal goals came when she scored a hat-trick during a 9–0 win over London Bees in the 2019–20 League Cup group stage.

London Bees 
On 4 September 2020, Filis signed for FA Women's Championship side London Bees.

West Ham United 
On 2 July 2021, Filis signed for West Ham United

International career
Born in England, Filis is of Turkish descent through her father. She is a youth international for England, having played up to the England U19s.

Career statistics

Club

Honours

Club 
Arsenal
 Women's Super League: 2018–19

References 

2002 births
Living people
English women's footballers
England women's youth international footballers
English people of Turkish descent
Arsenal W.F.C. players
Women's association football midfielders
West Ham United F.C. Women players